The 2003 Grand Prix of St. Petersburg was the first round of the 2003 CART World Series season, held on February 23, 2003 at Albert Whitted Airport and the surrounding streets of St. Petersburg, Florida.

Report
French rookie Sébastien Bourdais took pole position at an average speed of 106.710 mph (171.733 km/h) for the Newman/Haas Racing team. Paul Tracy lined up alongside him, with Adrian Fernández and Patrick Carpentier on row two.

The race began under green, with Bourdais leading into turn one ahead of Tracy. At the end of the first lap, an incident between Bruno Junqueira and rookie Mario Haberfeld occurred when Haberfeld pushed Junqueira along the pit wall, and nearly drove straight into Michel Jourdain Jr. when the Mexican was turning into the first corner. On the third lap, Alex Tagliani struck the tire wall at turn 10, bringing out the first caution of the race. 

Bourdais led until lap 31, when he lost the lead to Tiago Monteiro in the first scheduled pit stops. Tracy had pushed enough laps to come out ahead of Bourdais when the pack was finally shuffled after the stops. On lap 42, the Frenchman damaged his car into a concrete wall and had to pit for repairs, leaving him several laps down. This left Tracy unchallenged, the Canadian scoring the first victory of the 2003 season in his first race driving for Team Player's. Jourdain was second and Junqueira finished third.

Qualifying results

* Rodolfo Lavin's time from the first qualification session was withdrawn when he changed to a backup car for the second session.

Race

Caution flags

Notes

 New Track Record Sébastien Bourdais 1:00.928 (Qualification Session #2)
 New Race Record Paul Tracy 2:04:28.904
 Average Speed 91.401 mph

References

External links
 Full Weekend Times & Results

Grand Prix of St. Petersburg
St. Petersburg
Grand Prix of St. Petersburg
21st century in St. Petersburg, Florida